Earlwood is a suburb of Sydney, in the state of New South Wales, Australia. Earlwood is located 10 kilometres south-west of the Sydney central business district, and is part of the Canterbury-Bankstown area. It is in the local government area of the City of Canterbury-Bankstown.

Earlwood stretches from the southern bank of the Cooks River to the northern bank of Wolli Creek. Wolli Creek (the suburb), Turrella and Bardwell Park lie to the south across Wolli Creek, while Canterbury, Hurlstone Park and Marrickville are located to the north and east across Cooks River. The locality of Undercliffe is part of the suburb. Clemton Park adjoins the suburb to the west. Earlwood is primarily residential with some commercial developments around the main road, Homer Street.

History

Earlwood began as a land grant obtained by John Parkes in 1827. John Parkes and his sons operated logging camp called Parkes Camp in 1829 and felled the timber on his 50-acre grant. Later it became known as Parkestown. The name was changed to Forest Hill around 1905-06 and changed again to Earlwood in 1918. 'Wood' reportedly commemorated a former mayor of Canterbury and 'Earl' was the name of two brothers who owned a pig and poultry farm on Wolli Creek. The Woodearl' estate was a subdivision in the area of Earlwood Primary School. 

Early residents included F. and A. Martin who were granted land in the eastern part, and Joshua Thorpe, architect and Assistant Colonial Engineer, whose  estate was in the west, stretching from Cooks River to Wolli Creek.  In 1828, Joshua Thorp built a house he called Juhan Munna, an Aboriginal phrase meaning "to go away." The house was later renamed Undecliffe and rented to managers of the Canterbury Sugarworks.  The property was bought by the solicitor P.A.Tompson in 1850. In 1854, Tompson built a bridge on the site of Thorp's punt.  

Frederick Wright Unwin, solicitor and director of the Australasian Sugar Company, obtained land in the Undercliffe area, east of Thorp's property, in 1840, and built his home, which he called Wanstead. Initially, a punt was used to cross the Cooks River. Later, a wooden bridge was built and the road eventually became known as Unwins Bridge Road. The name of the property survives in Wanstead Avenue and Wanstead Reserve. Abraham B. Pollack acquired eight grants in the 1830s, totaling , which covered most of Earlwood and Undercliffe. Subdivision began in the 1880s.  

After World War I, a war services subdivision was created west of Wardell Road for retired soldiers and their families. The streets of that subdivision commemorate the names of famous men and battles connected with the war, such as Kitchener, Hamilton, Vimy, Fricourt, Polygon, Thompson, Guedecourt and Flers. The area incorporating Bedford, River, Grove, Richmond, and Stone streets was a subdivision known as the Canterbury estate and was divided for workers of the quarry at the end of River Street. This estate also took in Louisa, Sparke, Caroline, Elsie and Ann streets and also Willow lane, some of the streets had different names to those that they are known by today. A notable occupant of the area was the Scott family which operated the Scotties tissue factory on the corner of Louisa and River Streets.

Between 1912 and 1957, electric trams operated along Homer Street to Earlwood, providing service to the city via Marrickville and Newtown. The service is now provided by buses. Since the 1960s, the area has had an increasing population of Greek ancestry.

Heritage listings 
Earlwood has a number of heritage-listed sites, including:

 Pine Street: Cooks River Sewage Aqueduct
Unwin Street: Wolli Creek Aqueduct
Earlwood Aboriginal Art Site

Commercial area
The shopping centre is located on Homer Street, 500 metres up the hill from Bardwell Park railway station. A Coles supermarket and shops are also located in nearby Clarke Street. Earlwood has a number of restaurants and cafes scattered amongst the retail outlets, including Greek, Thai many other European establishments.

The site of the current KFC outlet was at one time the home of former prime minister John Howard whose parents operated two fuel outlets in neighboring Dulwich Hill. At one time two cinemas were located on Homer Street, known as the Chelsea and the Mayfair. Some of the shopping centre buildings, churches and Chelsea Theatre were constructed by the builder William Ernest May formerly of 421 Homer Street. 

The Earlwood Hotel is located on the corner of Earlwood Avenue and Homer Street. Earlwood - Bardwell Park RSL is located between Bardwell Park railway station and Wolli creek.  The club also manages the EBP Sports Bowling Club in Doris Street. The Earlwood ex-servicemens club is located in Fricourt Avenue. Earlwood local library is located on the corner of William Street and Homer Street, with a heritage listed post box outside the library.

Transport
Earlwood is serviced by a number of bus routes by Transit Systems and Punchbowl Bus Company.

Earlwood was previously the end of the line for electric tram services running on a similar route to that of the current 423 bus service, an extension from the bottom of the hill at Undercliffe.

There are no railway stations in Earlwood itself, but the stations Bexley North, Bardwell Park and Turrella on the East Hills railway line are adjacent to its southern border, across Wolli Creek. The stations Canterbury, Hurlstone Park and Dulwich Hill on the Bankstown railway line, and Tempe station, on the Illawarra railway line, are nearby to the north and east, across the Cooks River. The interchange station Wolli Creek is also physically close, but is not easily accessible from Earlwood because no crossing is nearby on Wolli Creek.

Churches 
 Adlay Academy of Designated Drillas 
 Our Lady of Lourdes Catholic Church
 St Georges Anglican Church
 Earlwood Presbyterian Church
 Earlwood Uniting Church
 Earlwood Baptist Church
 The Salvation Army Earlwood
 The Transfiguration of Our Lord Greek Orthodox Church.

Parks and gardens 
Gough Whitlam Park and Waterworth reserve are on Bayview Avenue near Tempe station. Canterbury bicycle velodrome is located nearby. Clean up Australia day was originated here on the banks of Cooks river. The Cooks river Festival is an annual event held in Gough Whitlam park.
 Heynes Reserve is a passive recreation area at the junction of the Cooks River and Cup and Saucer Creek.
 Sutton Reserve is adjacent to Heynes Reserve. It features a playground and is connected to the northern bank of the Cooks River by a wooden footbridge.
 Hughes Park is a sporting and multi-use area located near the Canterbury border and runs along a concrete canal leading to the Cooks River.
 Simpson Reserve is further west along the Cooks River.
 Beaman Park and Wills Ground are located further east along the river near Wardell Road, and offer sporting fields, bike paths and BBQ facilities. Beaman Park is also home to Earlwood Wanderers soccer club and Earlwood Saints rugby league club and Wills Ground is home to the Canterbury Rugby Union Club. Stafford Walk, passing through the park alongside the river, was named after Ailsie Stafford, a long-time member of the Cooks River Valley Association. A plaque was installed on 6 May 1980.
 Earlwood Oval is a local park and sporting ground. It also has historical and social importance as a long-standing home to one of the lawn bowls clubs, cricket club, soccer and football fixtures and the location of one of very few "rocket" type playground fixtures. Earlwood Oval also serves as the primary home ground for the football (soccer) club, Earlwood Wanderers.
 Girrawheen Park is a large recreational area along the northern bank of Wolli Creek. It has views over Arncliffe, Turrella and Bardwell Park. This area is heritage listed and covers a large area of rare remnant bushland along the banks of Wolli creek and played a large part in the reasoning behind the construction of a road tunnel beneath the Bardwell valley.
 Wanstead Reserve, located between Wanstead Avenue and the Cooks River, was named after Wanstead, the property of Frederick Wright Unwin, established in 1840.
 In the 1960s, Nanny Goat Hill (sometimes known as Prickly Pear Hill) was about to be quarried for use as fill in the construction of Sydney Airport runway extensions. Harold May, Peter Ridsdale and Carl Lyons formed a resistance committee to thwart the operation and succeeded in having Canterbury Council cancel the proposed destruction of this now valued recreation area. The Canterbury Mayor Jim Beaman was an advisor to the May, Ridsdale, Lyons committee. Beaman Park is named after him.

Population

Demographics
Earlwood is a multicultural area, having a large proportion of Greek-Australians.  Nearby Marrickville was a major center of Sydney's Greek community in the 1950s and 1960s, but in the second half of the 20th century most of its Greek residents moved south and west into suburbs like Earlwood, Clemton Park, Bardwell Park, Kingsgrove and Bexley North (all of which have more than 15% of residents reporting Greek ancestry at the 2016 census), which offered larger family homes and blocks of land. 22.3% of the population of Earlwood reported Greek ancestry at the 2021 Census. 

According to the 2021 census of Population, there were 18,053 residents in Earlwood. The most common reported ancestries were Greek 22.3%, Australian 16.9%, English 14.9%, Italian 9.0% and Lebanese 7.8%. 61.9 of people were born in Australia. The next most common countries of birth were Greece 7.4%, China 3.0%, Portugal 2.4%, Vietnam 2.4% and Lebanon 2.4%. 49.8% of people spoke only English at home. Other languages spoken at home included Greek 18.1%, Arabic 5.6%, Italian 3.4%, Vietnamese 3.2% and Portuguese 3.0. The most common responses for religious affiliation were Catholic 29.0%, No Religion 24.4% and Orthodox 24.2%.

Notable residents
The following notable people have lived in Earlwood:
Canterbury Bulldogs player Josh Addo-Carr
 Actor Grahame Bond (The Aunty Jack Show)
 Actor Alex Dimitriades
Former rugby league player Blake Ferguson
 Former Prime Minister John Howard 
 Boxers Anthony Mundine and Tony Mundine
 Former Newtown and Australian Rugby league player Dick Poole

Politics 
Federal Government: Earlwood is in the Division of Barton in the Australian House of Representatives. Historically, the Division of Barton has been a bellwether electorate. It is currently held by the ALP.

State Government: Earlwood is in the Electoral district of Canterbury in the New South Wales Legislative Assembly. The districts include surrounding suburbs of Canterbury, Campsie, Hurlstone Park, Kingsgrove, Croydon Park, western Dulwich Hill and eastern Belfield.

Local Government: Earlwood is part of the Canterbury Ward of the City of Canterbury-Bankstown, which elects three councillors to the city council.

Topography
The suburb of Earlwood stretches in the northeast from the tall escarpment on the south bank of the Cooks River at its junction with Wolli Creek, a locality called Undercliffe. It stretches west (upriver) along the southern bank of the Cooks River up to the junction of Cup and Saucer Creek, by which point the river bank becomes much flatter. Wolli Creek forms the boundary of the suburb to the south. The Airport & South Line runs along the valley of Wolli Creek in this area, just outside the boundary of Earlwood, and provides the nearest rail access for residents of the suburb. In the west, the local artery road Bexley Road forms the boundary between Earlwood and neighboring Canterbury, Clemton Park and Kingsgrove.

Region of Sydney
Although by most customary definitions Earlwood falls into the customary region of South Western Sydney or Canterbury-Bankstown, it sits at the far eastern end of that region. It is separated from Marrickville in the northeast by the Cooks River valley and parklands. Marrickville is part of the Inner West region, and so Earlwood is sometimes, especially in commercial contexts, identified as part of the Inner West region despite the geographical separation. Because Earlwood is also within the cadastral Parish of St George (used for land title purposes), it also falls within the St George region by the traditional definition. 

Demographically, Earlwood is more similar to its neighbours in the west and south, in that it has a large proportion of residents of Greek heritage: Bardwell Park to the south (in the St George region) is also 18% Greek by ancestry, and Clemton Park to the west (in the Canterbury-Bankstown or South-Western Sydney region) is 19.8% Greek by ancestry. By contrast, Marrickville is only 6.6% Greek by ancestry, and has more residents born in Vietnam (6.0%) than Greece (4.2%).

References

External links 
 (Canterbury City Council.)

 
Suburbs of Sydney
Populated places established in 1829
City of Canterbury-Bankstown